Saint John the Evangelist is a 1609 work by El Greco, produced towards the end of his time in Toledo, Spain. It now hangs in the Museo del Prado, to which it was left in 1921 by the collector César Cabañas Caballero.

It shows John the Evangelist as a young man holding a chalice, in which is a dragon, referring to his surviving a poisoned cup of wine in prison. It is very similar to the painting of the same subject by the same painter in Toledo Cathedral.

Bibliography (in Spanish)
 ÁLVAREZ LOPERA, José, El Greco, Madrid, Arlanza, 2005, Biblioteca «Descubrir el Arte», (colección «Grandes maestros»). .
 SCHOLZ-HÄNSEL, Michael, El Greco, Colonia, Taschen, 2003. .
 ArteHistoria.com. «San Juan Evangelista». [Consulta: 09.01.2011].

References

El Greco
1609 paintings
Paintings by El Greco in the Museo del Prado